The Girl Who Kicked the Hornets' Nest is a 2009 Swedish-Danish crime thriller film with German co-production directed by Daniel Alfredson from a screenplay by Ulf Rydberg and produced by Søren Stærmose, based on the 2007 novel of the same name by Swedish writer Stieg Larsson, the third entry in his Millennium series. Starring Noomi Rapace and Michael Nyqvist, it was the third and final installment of the film series, released two months following The Girl Who Played with Fire. It also marked the final film appearance of Per Oscarsson, who died in a house fire on 31 December 2010.

Plot
The film begins at the conclusion of The Girl Who Played with Fire. Computer hacker Lisbeth Salander is airlifted to a hospital in Gothenburg to recover from gunshot wounds inflicted by her father, crime boss Alexander Zalachenko. Journalist Mikael Blomkvist, who Salander helped on a previous case, resumes his efforts to clear her of several murder charges, knowing that she was framed by the "Section", a group within the Swedish Security Service that illegally sheltered Zalachenko after he defected from the Soviet Union.

Section members Evert Gullberg and Fredrik Clinton decide to silence Zalachenko and Salander to preserve their secrets. Gullberg arrives at the hospital and kills Zalachenko, but is unable to reach Salander; he then commits suicide. Clinton plans to have Salander recommitted to the mental hospital where the Section had her institutionalized as a child after she nearly killed Zalachenko. His collaborator in this plan is Dr. Peter Teleborian, the hospital's administrator, who "treated" the young Salander by putting her in restraints for the smallest infractions.

Blomkvist persuades her doctor to sneak an Internet phone into Salander's room, whereupon Salander contacts her fellow hacker, Plague, to see if he can find something on Teleborian. She then tells Blomkvist that Annika Giannini, her lawyer and Blomkvist's sister, has permission to use a video showing her state-appointed guardian Nils Bjurman raping her; Bjurman, a former Section employee, is one of the people she is accused of murdering.

Ronald Niedermann, Zalachenko's son and enforcer who previously tried to kill Salander's girlfriend Miriam, remains a fugitive, wanted for killing a police officer. Sonny, a member of an outlaw motorcycle gang Salander encountered in the previous film, learns that Niedermann went to his home to hide out. There, Sonny finds his brother dead and his girlfriend badly injured. She tells him that Niedermann was the culprit, and Sonny vows revenge.

On the day of her murder trial, Salander enters court with piercings, a mohawk, black makeup, and black leather clothing. Called as an expert witness for the prosecution, Teleborian characterizes Salander as delusional and violent; but Giannini gradually demolishes his credibility, using Salander's words and files from the hospital. She also presents the video proving Bjurman raped Salander.

As Giannini presents her case, the police arrest the people involved with the Section and seize their place of operation. In court, Blomkvist and Giannini prove that Teleborian made a false diagnosis on orders from the Section, and that the evidence against her was planted. Teleborian is then arrested for possession of child pornography, which Plague discovered after hacking into his laptop. The court releases Salander.

Salander checks on a property she has inherited from her father and discovers the warehouse where her step-brother Niedermann is hiding. He tries to kill her, but she nails his feet to the floor with a nail gun. She calls Sonny and tells the bikers where to find him, and then calls the police.

Blomkvist visits Salander to tell her that the motorcycle gang killed Niedermann and were arrested at the warehouse afterward. They then reconcile and go their separate ways.

Cast
 Noomi Rapace as Lisbeth Salander
 Tehilla Blad as young Lisbeth Salander
 Michael Nyqvist as Mikael Blomkvist
 Lena Endre as Erika Berger, editor of Millennium
 Annika Hallin as Annika Giannini, a lawyer and sister of Mikael Blomkvist
 Sofia Ledarp as Malin Eriksson
 Jacob Ericksson as Christer Malm, photographer of Millennium
 Georgi Staykov as Alexander Zalachenko ("Zala")
 Aksel Morisse as Dr. Anders Jonasson
 Niklas Hjulström as Prosecutor Richard Ekström
 Micke Spreitz as Ronald Niedermann
 Anders Ahlbom as Dr. Peter Teleborian
 Hans Alfredson as Evert Gullberg, former head of "The Section"
 Lennart Hjulström as Fredrik Clinton, former head of "The Section" after Gullberg
 Carl-Åke Eriksson as Bertil Janeryd
 Per Oscarsson as Holger Palmgren
 Michalis Koutsogiannakis as Dragan Armansky
 Mirja Turestedt as Monica Figuerola
 Johan Kylén as Police Inspector Jan Bublanski
 Tanja Lorentzon as Sonja Modig
 Alexandra Hummingson as murder victim

Release

The film was released in Sweden, Norway, and Denmark on 29 November 2009, and in Finland and Iceland in January 2010. The film was subsequently released in other European countries throughout the spring and summer of 2010. The film opened the Scottsdale (Arizona) International Film Festival on 1 October 2010, and was screened on 13 October 2010 at the Mill Valley (California) Film Festival; the film then had a limited release in United States and Canadian theaters beginning 29 October 2010.

Reception

The Girl Who Kicked the Hornets' Nest received mixed reviews from critics. Review aggregation website Rotten Tomatoes gave the film a score of 53% based on 125 reviews, with an average score of 5.8/10, the consensus being, "Slow and mostly devoid of the stellar chemistry between its two leads, The Girl Who Kicked the Hornets' Nest is a disappointingly uneven conclusion to the Millennium trilogy."

Despite the low rating, the film did receive positive reviews from such noteworthy critics as Peter Travers, James Berardinelli, and Roger Ebert, who gave the film three out of four stars, stating, "These are all very well-made films. Like most European films, they have adults who are grown-ups, not arrested adolescents. Mikael and Erika, his boss and lover, have earned the lines in their faces, and don't act like reckless action heroes. They make their danger feel so real to us that we realize the heroes of many action movies don't really believe they're in any danger at all."

Reviewing the original Swedish version in national daily newspaper Svenska Dagbladet, Jan Söderqvist is dismissive of the thin plot: his article is titled 'No, it doesn't last the distance', and laments that "the whole responsibility for carrying this grandiose production rests on Lisbeth Salander's slender shoulders". But Söderqvist remains enthusiastic about Rapace and her character, Lisbeth Salander: "Salander is, on the other hand, undeniably an original and fascinating character, full of possibilities and secrets, and if Noomi Rapace builds an international acting career on these three films I have nothing to say against it." Söderqvist continues: "There is an enticing darkness in her glance and a brittle hardness about her defences that more than matches her tattoos."

Maaret Koskinen, reviewing the film in Sweden's national daily Dagens Nyheter, found it a pity "that the subsequent Millennium films dribble away a given golden opportunity" and "devalue an unprecedented accumulation of popular cultural capital." All that remains in the third section, writes Koskinen, is a skeleton (of the book's power). Besides, she notes, "one sees Noomi Rapace far too little."

Notes

References

External links
 
 
 
 

Millennium (novel series) adaptations
2009 films
2009 crime thriller films
2009 LGBT-related films
2000s mystery thriller films
Danish crime thriller films
Danish sequel films
Female bisexuality in film
Films about journalists
Films based on crime novels
Films based on mystery novels
Films based on Swedish novels
Films based on thriller novels
Films set in Stockholm
Films shot in Stockholm
Films directed by Daniel Alfredson
German crime thriller films
German films about revenge
German mystery thriller films
German sequel films
Nordisk Film films
Swedish crime thriller films
Swedish detective films
2000s Swedish-language films
Swedish mystery thriller films
Swedish sequel films
2000s German films
2000s Swedish films